A HEENT examination is a portion of a physical examination that principally concerns the head, eyes, ears, nose, and throat.

Steps
 IPPA
 Inspection of scars or skin changes
 Palpation of temporomandibular joint, thyroid, and lymph nodes
 Percussion may involve the skin above the frontal sinuses and paranasal sinuses to detect any signs of pain
 Auscultation for carotid bruits
 Tests specific to HEENT examination
 Eyes: eye examination and acuity (including ophthalmoscope)
 Ears: hearing examination and evaluation of tympanic membrane (TM) (otoscope used in evaluation of ears, nose, and mouth)

A neurological examination is usually considered separate from the HEENT evaluation, although there can be some overlap in some cases.

Sample write-up

References

Medical terminology